A geometrized unit system, geometric unit system or geometrodynamic unit system is a system of natural units in which the base physical units are chosen so that the speed of light in vacuum, c, and the gravitational constant, G, are set equal to unity.

The geometrized unit system is not a completely defined system.  Some systems are geometrized unit systems in the sense that they set these, in addition to other constants, to unity, for example Stoney units and Planck units.

This system is useful in physics, especially in the special and general theories of relativity. All physical quantities are identified with geometric quantities such as areas, lengths, dimensionless numbers, path curvatures, or sectional curvatures.

Many equations in relativistic physics appear simpler when expressed in geometric units, because all occurrences of G and of c drop out. For example, the Schwarzschild radius of a nonrotating uncharged black hole with mass m becomes . For this reason, many books and papers on relativistic physics use geometric units. An alternative system of geometrized units is often used in particle physics and cosmology, in which  instead. This introduces an additional factor of 8π into Newton's law of universal gravitation but simplifies the Einstein field equations, the Einstein–Hilbert action, the Friedmann equations and the Newtonian Poisson equation by removing the corresponding factor.

Practical measurements and computations are usually done in SI units, but conversions are generally quite straightforward.

Definition

In geometric units, every time interval is interpreted as the distance travelled by light during that given time interval. That is, one second is interpreted as one light-second, so time has the geometric units of length. This is dimensionally consistent with the notion that, according to the kinematical laws of special relativity, time and distance are on an equal footing.

Energy and momentum are interpreted as components of the four-momentum vector, and mass is the magnitude of this vector, so in geometric units these must all have the dimension of length. We can convert a mass expressed in kilograms to the equivalent mass expressed in metres by multiplying by the conversion factor G/c2. This is half the Schwarzschild radius of a one solar mass black hole. All other conversion factors can be worked out by combining these two.

The small numerical size of the few conversion factors reflects the fact that relativistic effects are only noticeable when large masses or high speeds are considered.

Geometric quantities 
The components of curvature tensors such as the Einstein tensor have, in geometric units, the dimensions of sectional curvature. So do the components of the stress–energy tensor. Therefore, the Einstein field equation is dimensionally consistent in these units.

Path curvature is the reciprocal of the magnitude of the curvature vector of a curve, so in geometric units it has the dimension of inverse length. Path curvature measures the rate at which a nongeodesic curve bends in spacetime, and if we interpret a timelike curve as the world line of some observer, then its path curvature can be interpreted as the magnitude of the acceleration experienced by that observer. Physical quantities which can be identified with path curvature include the components of the electromagnetic field tensor.

Any velocity can be interpreted as the slope of a curve; in geometric units, slopes are evidently dimensionless ratios. Physical quantities which can be identified with dimensionless ratios include the components of the electromagnetic potential four-vector and the electromagnetic current four-vector.

Physical quantities such as mass and electric charge which can be identified with the magnitude of a timelike vector have the geometric dimension of length. Physical quantities such as angular momentum which can be identified with the magnitude of a bivector have the geometric dimension of area.

Here is a table collecting some important physical quantities according to their dimensions in geometrized units. They are listed together with the appropriate conversion factor for SI units.

This table can be augmented to include temperature, as indicated above, as well as further derived physical quantities such as various moments.

References

  See Appendix F

External links
 Conversion factors for energy equivalents

General relativity
Systems of units
Natural units